Anchimolgidae is a family of cyclopoid copepods in the order Cyclopoida. There are more than 30 genera and 130 described species in Anchimolgidae.

Genera
These 32 genera belong to the family Anchimolgidae:

 Alienigena Cheng, MJ Ho & C.F.Dai, 2016
 Allopodion Humes, 1978
 Amarda Humes & Stock, 1972
 Amardopsis Humes, 1974
 Anchimolgus Humes & Stock, 1972
 Andrianellus Humes & Stock, 1972
 Cerioxynus Humes, 1974
 Clamocus Humes, 1979
 Dumbeana Humes, 1996
 Ecphysarion Humes, 1993
 Euxynus Humes, 1992
 Exodontomolgus Kim I.H., 2007
 Haplomolgus H.o.Humes, 1968
 Humesiella Sebastian & Pillai, 1973
 Jamescookina Humes, 1991
 Juxtandrianellus Humes, 1995
 Karanges Humes, 1979
 Kawanolus Humes, 1978
 Lipochaetes Humes, 1996
 Mycoxynus Humes, 1973
 Odontomolgus Humes & Stock, 1972
 Panjakus Humes & Stock, 1972
 Paraclamocus Humes, 1997
 Paramarda Humes, 1978
 Paranchimolgus Kim I.H., 2007
 Parandrianellus Humes, 1991
 Prionomolgus H.o.Humes, 1968
 Rakotoa Humes & Stock, 1972
 Schedomolgus Humes & Stock, 1972
 Scyphuliger Humes, 1991
 Sociellus Humes, 1992
 Unicispina Humes, 1993

References

Cyclopoida
Articles created by Qbugbot
Crustacean families